Koidu is a village in Saue Parish, Harju County in northern Estonia. Koidu is bordered by the Vääna River to the southwest and by the Tallinn–Keila–Paldiski railway to the southeast. There's a station named "Padula" in Koidu village.

Koidu village was established on 16 July 2012 by detaching the land from Alliku village. The initiative came from the local community.

References

Villages in Harju County
2012 establishments in Estonia
Populated places established in 2012